State Route 121 (SR 121) is a  state highway in southern Maine. It begins at an intersection with U.S. Route 302 (US 302) and SR 35 in Raymond and ends in Auburn.  It is signed as a north-south highway, which accurately reflects its alignment from Raymond to Oxford, but from there it runs almost due east (and slightly south) to its terminus in Auburn.

Route description
SR 121 begins in the south at an intersection with US 302 and SR 35, not far from the southern terminus of SR 85.  It proceeds northward, paralleling SR 85 to the west of Panther Pond until reaching its first intersection with SR 11 in Casco.  It continues north along the west side of Pleasant Lake and Thompson Lake before entering Oxford, where it turns to the east to meet SR 26 just south of the Oxford County Regional Airport. SR 121 briefly joins SR 26 in a wrong-way concurrency before splitting off southeast towards Mechanic Falls (continually signed as "north"). It heads into the town center where it meets the southern terminus of SR 124 and SR 11 for a second time. From here to its terminus in Auburn, SR 121 is co-signed with SR 11.

SR 11 and SR 121 proceed out of town to the southeast (both signed as "north"), meeting the southern terminus of SR 119 before entering Auburn and proceeding towards downtown on Minot Avenue. Signage posted at the intersection of Minot Avenue and Rotary Street (the latter of which also carries southbound US 202, SR 4, and SR 100 on a one-way pair) notes that this intersection is the end of SR 121. However, per Maine Department of Transportation documentation, SR 121 continues north on Washington Street (the northbound direction for US 202, SR 4, SR 11, and SR 100), meets the southbound lanes at Minot Avenue, and ends at the intersection of Court Street, Union Street, and Minot Avenue.

Major intersections

References

External links

Floodgap Roadgap's RoadsAroundME: Maine State Route 121

121
Transportation in Androscoggin County, Maine
Transportation in Cumberland County, Maine
Transportation in Oxford County, Maine